Dysphania pumilio is a species of flowering plant in the family  Chenopodioideae known by the common name clammy goosefoot.

It is native to Australia, but it can be found in other parts of the world as an introduced species, often growing in disturbed and waste areas such as roadsides and lots. It is known from many parts of North America and Europe, and it was recently spotted in Iran for the first time, in the Māzandarān Province. It is thought to have first arrived in Europe with imports of wool from Australia. This is a very aromatic annual herb growing erect, sticky, glandular stems up to about 25 centimeters tall. The leaves are alternately arranged, up to 2 centimeters long, lance-shaped to oval and edged with bumpy lobes. The surface of the leaf is coated in white sticky glands and sparse hairs. The inflorescence is a spherical cluster of densely packed tiny green flowers located in the leaf axils. Each flower is pebbly with glands and covers the developing fruit.

References

External links

Jepson Manual Treatment
USDA Plants Profile
Flora of Missouri photos

pumilio
Flora of New Jersey
Flora without expected TNC conservation status